Carhuascancha (possibly from Quechua qarwa yellowish / golden / pale / leaf worm, larva of a beetle, kancha enclosure, enclosed place, yard, a frame, or wall that encloses) or Tumarinaraju is a mountain in the Cordillera Blanca in the Andes of Peru with an elevation of  or  above sea level. It is situated in the Ancash Region, Huari Province, Huantar District, and in the Huaraz Province, Huaraz District. Carhuascancha lies north-west of Huantsán.

The Carhuascancha River originates east of the mountain and flows eastwards.

References 

Mountains of Peru
Mountains of Ancash Region
Glaciers of Peru